Fantasia may refer to:

Film and television 
 Fantasia (1940 film), an animated musical film produced by Walt Disney
 Fantasia 2000, a sequel to the 1940 film
 Fantasia (2004 film), a Hong Kong comedy film
 Fantasia (2014 film), a Chinese film
 "Fantasia" (Eureka Seven episode)
 Fantasia International Film Festival, a film festival in Montreal
 Fantasia, a fictional world in the NeverEnding Story films
 Fantasia for Real, a reality television show

Games 
 Fantasia (video game), a 1991 game for the Sega Mega Drive based on the Disney film
 Fantasia: Music Evolved, a 2014 music rhythm game for the Xbox One and Xbox 360 Kinect based on the Disney film
 Fantasia, a fictional realm in Chocobo Racing and a level in that game

Music 
 Fantasia (music), a free musical composition structured according to the composer's fancy
 Fantasia No. 3 (Mozart), a 1782 piece of music for solo piano composed by Wolfgang Amadeus Mozart
 Fantasia in F minor (Schubert), an 1828 piano piece for four hands composed by Franz Schubert
 Fantasia contrappuntistica, a solo piano piece composed by Ferruccio Busoni
 Fantasia on a Theme by Thomas Tallis, a 1910 composition by Ralph Vaughan Williams
 Fantasia on British Sea Songs, a composition by Sir Henry Wood
 Fantasía para un gentilhombre, a 1954 work by Joaquín Rodrigo

Performers
 Fantasia (singer) or Fantasia Barrino (born 1984), American R&B singer

Albums
 Fantasia (Fantasia Barrino album) (2006)
 Fantasía (Franco De Vita album) (1986)
 Fantasia (Eliane Elias album) (1992)
 Fantasía (Yolandita Monge album) (1980)
 Fantasia, a 2012 album by Yuja Wang
 Fantasia x a 2020 album by Monsta X

Songs
 "Fantasías", a 2019 song by Rauw Alejandro and Farruko
 "Fantasia", a 1967 song by Mario Merola
 "Fantasia", a 2020 song by Monsta X from the album Fantasia X
 "Fantasiaa", the Finnish entry in the Eurovision Song Contest 1983, performed by Ami Aspelund

Ships 
 Fantasia 27, a French sailboat design
 MSC Fantasia, a cruise ship operated by MSC Cruises
 Fantasia-class cruise ship, a class of three cruise ships operated by MSC Cruises
 MS SeaFrance Cézanne or MS Fantasia, a cross-channel ferry operated by SNCF
 MS Stena Fantasia or MS Fantasia, a cross-channel ferry operated by Sealink and Stena Line
 TSS Duke of York (1935) or Fantasia, a cruise ship operated by Chandris Line

Other uses 
 Fantasia (comics), a character in the Marvel Universe
 Fantasia (franchise), an American media franchise owned by the Walt Disney Company
 Fantasia (performance), a traditional equestrian performance practiced in North Africa
 Fantasia (wrestler), American professional wrestler
 1224 Fantasia, an asteroid
 Fantasia Holdings, a property developer in China
 Bebearia phantasia or fantasia, a butterfly in the family Nymphalidae
 Show tango or fantasia, a more theatrical and exaggerated form of Argentine tango

People with the surname
 Rick Fantasia, American sociologist
 Orazio Fantasia (born 1995), Australian footballer

See also 
 Fantasio (disambiguation)
 Fantasy (disambiguation)
 Fantazia (disambiguation)
 Phantasia (disambiguation)